Aqua Tarta Music was a record label owned by Canadian musician Gaye Delorme, through which he released a series of recordings between 1990 and 2008.  The label did not diversify beyond the recordings of Delorme, despite the fact that Delorme was a producer of other artists, including k.d. lang, Jann Arden and Fosterchild.

Aqua Tarta Releases

American Jumbo - Beautiful Guitar Vol. 2 (2008)
Borderline (2002)
Delorme (2002)
Rodeo Songs (2002)
The Best of Gaye Delorme (1999)
Beautiful Guitar (1998)
Blue Wave Sessions (1990)

References

Defunct record labels of Canada